Carabus cristoforii is a species of black ground beetle from family Carabidae that lives in Andorra, France and Spain.

References

cristoforii
Beetles described in 1823